The ice hockey team rosters at the 1932 Winter Olympics consisted of the following players. Forty-eight players from four nations competed.

Canada
Head coach: Jack Hughes

Germany
Head coach: Erich Römer

Poland

Head coach: Tadeusz Sachs

United States
Head coach: Alfred Winsor

References

Sources

Hockey Hall Of Fame page on the 1932 Olympics

rosters
1932